Bryan Miller (born February 17, 1983) is an American retired professional ice hockey defenseman.

Career 
Miller retired following the 2011–12 ECHL season in which he had been named to the All-ECHL First Team. He played eight seasons of professional hockey, serving his final five seasons with the Alaska Aces, including with the 2011 Kelly Cup winning team.

Awards and honors

References

External links

1983 births
Living people
Alaska Aces (ECHL) players
Albany River Rats players
American men's ice hockey defensemen
Boston University Terriers men's ice hockey players
Chicago Freeze players
Ice hockey players from New Jersey
Lowell Devils players
People from Wayne, New Jersey
Peoria Rivermen (AHL) players
Providence Bruins players
Sportspeople from Passaic County, New Jersey
Trenton Titans players
USA Hockey National Team Development Program players